"Til Love Comes Again" is a song recorded by American country music artist Reba McEntire.  It was released in September 1989 as the second single from the album Sweet Sixteen.  The song reached #4 on the Billboard Hot Country Singles & Tracks chart.  The song was written by Ed Hill and Bob Regan.

Chart performance

Year-end charts

References

1989 singles
Reba McEntire songs
Songs written by Ed Hill
Songs written by Bob Regan
Song recordings produced by Jimmy Bowen
MCA Records singles
1989 songs